Mecodema kipjac is a large-bodied ground beetle species found near Kirikopuni in Northland, New Zealand.

Diagnosis 
Distinguished from other Mecodema species in the North Island by:

 the small foveae situated directly behind the eye; 
 anterad pronotal foveae on the disc a distinctive shallow depression with scattered pits and short wrinkles mesad foveae; 
 distinct shape of the apical portion of the penis lobe.

Description 
Length 33.1 mm, pronotal width 9.4 mm, elytral width 10.8 mm. Colour of entire body dark reddish-brown, head matte black.

Natural history 
More research is required.

References 

kipjac
Beetles described in 2019